The Dakota Zoo is a zoo in Bismarck, North Dakota located on the banks of the Missouri River. It is the third zoo built in North Dakota.

The Dakota Zoo is accredited by the Association of Zoos and Aquariums (AZA).

History
The Dakota Zoo began on a  farm owned by Marc and Betty Christianson on the northern edge of Bismarck. At first, the farm boarded domestic animals such as dogs, cats, and horses. At one point, the farm was used to raise mink for profit. Over time, people who knew of the Christiansons' love for animals began dropping off strays and injured animals, knowing that they would be well taken care of. As the number of animals increased, word got out and more and more people came to see them.

After some publicity from a local TV station, petitions were signed by 780 people supporting the idea of a community zoo in Bismarck, l and Marc Christianson took these to the Bismarck Park Board to present the concept of a self-supporting community zoo. In 1958, the Park Board made  of Park District land in Sertoma Park available to the zoo.

The majority of construction was initially done by Marc and his crew with donated materials. In the first year, 40,000 people paid ten cents each to visit the zoo. By 2007, there were about 3400 zoo members, and more than 100,000 visitors per year to view 125 species of animals and birds.

The Dakota Zoo has been accredited by the Association of Zoos and Aquariums (AZA) since 1991, and remains self-supported through admissions, concession sales, animal sales, the adopt an animal program, memberships, and donations.

Animals 

Ungulates are mostly housed in the southern part of the zoo in large, open enclosures. Animals in this area include goats, pigs, miniature horses, miniature donkeys, Highland cattle, bison, pronghorn, Przewalski's horse, Bactrian camel, Dall sheep, bighorn sheep, mountain goats, moose, reindeer, longhorn cattle, Clydesdale horses, and elk. Llama, mouflon, and aoudad are in the northeast section of the zoo.

Predators are housed in the northern part of the zoo, and include tigers, snow leopards, wolves, bears, Canada lynx, bobcats, cougars, coyotes, foxes, badgers, and servals.

Birds are housed in a variety of smaller enclosures and aviaries, mostly in the center of the zoo, and include eagles, emus, many South American birds, turkey vultures, wild turkeys, owls, and various water birds.

Monkeys are mostly housed in the Monkey Barn near the center of the zoo, and include cotton-top tamarins, Goeldi’s monkey, golden-headed lion tamarin, pygmy marmoset, red ruffed lemurs, squirrel monkeys, white-fronted marmosets. Spider monkey are in their own outdoor enclosure.

The zoo also includes an exhibit of reptiles and small mammals, a butterfly house, a prairie dog town, and a monkey barn.

Facilities
The Bismarck Tribune Discovery Center is just inside the zoo from the entrance gate.

Conservation
The zoo participates in the AZA Species Survival Plan (SSP).

The future 
In 1987, the Bismarck Tribune challenged the zoo to develop a master plan to outline the future course of the zoo. The zoo board developed a plan which is reviewed and updated regularly, with the last review having been in 2005. There have been three major capital campaigns since the master plan was initiated, to raise money for the zoo.

The "Beyond the Bear Necessities" capital campaign started in 1988, and raised money for exhibits such as the bear habitat, river otter exhibit and canine and small animal exhibits. The second campaign, called "Discovery 2000 - Turning Dollars Into Senses," raised $1.5 million for exhibits including moose, mountain goat, mountain lion, bobcat, lynx and the Discovery Zoo. in 2002, "Make the Big Cats Roar" was launched to raise $1.9 million. This goal was reached in late 2005, and an extended goal of $2.3 million was added.

Notes

External links

Zoos in North Dakota
Buildings and structures in Bismarck, North Dakota
Tourist attractions in Bismarck, North Dakota
Zoos established in 1961
1961 establishments in North Dakota